Advanced Land Observing Satellite (ALOS), also called Daichi (a Japanese word meaning "land"), was a 3810 kg Japanese satellite launched in 2006. After five years of service, the satellite lost power and ceased communication with Earth, but remains in orbit.

Launch 
ALOS was launched from Tanegashima, Japan, on 24 January 2006 by H-IIA No. 8. The launch had been delayed three times by weather and sensor problems.

Mission 
The satellite contained three sensors that were used for cartography and disaster monitoring of Asia and the Pacific Ocean. The Japan Aerospace Exploration Agency (JAXA) initially hoped to be able to launch the successor to ALOS during 2011, but this plan did not materialize.

In 2008, it was announced that the images generated by ALOS were too blurry to be of any use for map making. Only 52 of 4,300 images of Japan could be updated based on data from ALOS. Then, JAXA announced the problem was solved.

ALOS was used to analyze several disaster sites. Images of the devastated Japanese coast following the 2011 Tōhoku earthquake and tsunami were among the last major contributions from ALOS.

Decommissioning 

In April 2011, the satellite was found to have switched itself into power-saving mode due to deterioration of its solar arrays. Technicians could no longer confirm that any power was being generated. It was suggested that meteoroids may have struck ALOS, creating the anomaly which eventually led to its shutdown.

On 12 May 2011, JAXA sent a command to the satellite to power down its batteries and declared it dead in orbit.

See also 

 2006 in spaceflight
 ADEOS I, JERS-1 (predecessor spacecraft)
 ALOS-2
 Japan Coast Guard

References

External links 
 Paper on ALOS

Earth observation satellites of Japan
JAXA
Synthetic aperture radar satellites
Japan Coast Guard
2011 Tōhoku earthquake and tsunami
Derelict satellites orbiting Earth
Spacecraft launched by H-II rockets
Spacecraft launched in 2006